RTF may refer to:

Organisations
 African Union Regional Task Force, the military operation of the RCI-LRA, 2011–2018.
 Radiodiffusion-Télévision Française, a broadcaster in France, 1949–1964
 Russian Tennis Federation, the national governing body of tennis in Russia

Technology
 Radiotelephone
 Rich Text Format, a file format for documents
 Ready to Fly (radio control), type of model aircraft
 Real-Time Factor, a speech recognition performance metric

Other uses
 Return to Forever, an American jazz fusion band
 Refusal To File, one response a New Drug Application is met with in the United States

See also
 Return to Flight (disambiguation), one of several NASA space missions